In mathematics numerical analysis, the Nyström method or quadrature method seeks the numerical solution of an integral equation by replacing the integral with a representative weighted sum.  The continuous problem is broken into  discrete intervals; quadrature or numerical integration determines the weights and locations of representative points for the integral.

The problem becomes a system of linear equations with  equations and  unknowns, and the underlying function is implicitly represented by an interpolation using the chosen quadrature rule.  This discrete problem may be ill-conditioned, depending on the original problem and the chosen quadrature rule. 

Since the linear equations require  operations to solve, high-order quadrature rules perform better because low-order quadrature rules require large  for a given accuracy.  Gaussian quadrature is normally a good choice for smooth, non-singular problems.

Discretization of the integral 

Standard quadrature methods seek to represent an integral as a weighed sum in the following manner:

where  are the weights of the quadrature rule, and points  are the abscissas.

Example 

Applying this to the inhomogeneous Fredholm equation of the second kind

,

results in

.

See also 
 Boundary element method

References

Bibliography 
 Leonard M. Delves & Joan E. Walsh (eds): Numerical Solution of Integral Equations, Clarendon, Oxford, 1974.
 Hans-Jürgen Reinhardt: Analysis of Approximation Methods for Differential and Integral Equations, Springer, New York, 1985.

Integral equations
Numerical analysis
Numerical integration (quadrature)